Monika Lehmann is a former East German slalom canoeist who competed in the 1960s. She won a gold medal in the mixed C-2 team event at the 1965 ICF Canoe Slalom World Championships in Spittal.

References

Possibly living people
East German female canoeists
Year of birth missing
Medalists at the ICF Canoe Slalom World Championships